Cyril Rool (born 15 April 1975) is a French former professional footballer who played as a midfielder.

Career
Rool was born in Pertuis, Vaucluse.

He is known for his tough game, which is confirmed by a record of 25 red cards and 187 yellow cards in his career before the 2009–10 season, which constitutes a record in French championship.

While at Lens, he played in the final, as they won the 1998–99 Coupe de la Ligue.

On 23 July 2009, Rool joined Olympique de Marseille, where he finished his career.

References

External links

1975 births
Living people
People from Pertuis
Sportspeople from Vaucluse
Association football midfielders
French footballers
Ligue 1 players
Ligue 2 players
SC Bastia players
RC Lens players
Olympique de Marseille players
AS Monaco FC players
FC Girondins de Bordeaux players
OGC Nice players
Footballers from Provence-Alpes-Côte d'Azur